Jonathan Rosenberg may refer to:

 Jonathan Rosenberg (mathematician) (born 1951), American mathematician
 Jonathan Rosenberg (technologist) (born 1961), advisor to Google CEO Larry Page
 Jonathan Rosenberg (SIP author) (born 1970s), CTO at Cisco and former Skype employee
 Jonathan Rosenberg (artist) (born 1973), webcomic artist
 Jonathan Rosenberg (historian), American musical historian